The 2002 WTA Brasil Open was a WTA tennis tournament held in Bahia, Brazil from 9–14 September 2002, organised for women's professional tennis. It was a Tier 2 tournament and was part of the 2002 WTA Tour. The prize money was US$ 650,000.

Russian Anastasia Myskina won the singles and Virginia Ruano Pascual & Paola Suárez won the doubles title.

Champions

Singles

 Anastasia Myskina defeated  Eleni Daniilidou, 6-3, 0-6, 6-2
 It was Myskina's only title of the year and the 2nd of her career.

Doubles

 Virginia Ruano Pascual /  Paola Suárez defeated  Émilie Loit /  Rossana de los Ríos 6–4, 6–1
 It was Ruano Pascual's 7th title of the year and the 20th of her career. It was Suárez's 7th title of the year and the 27th of her career.

References
 WTA main draw
 ITF tournament details

2002 WTA Tour
2002 ITF Women's Circuit